Haluk is a Turkish given name for males. People named Haluk include:

Given name
 Haluk Akakçe (born 1970), Turkish artist
 Haluk Bayraktar (born 1978), Turkish engineer
 Haluk Bilginer (born 1954), Turkish actor
 Haluk Dinçer (born 1962), Turkish businessman
 Haluk Kırcı, Turkish criminal
 Haluk Koç (born 1954), Turkish politician
 Haluk Kurosman, Turkish music producer
 Haluk Levent (born 1968), Turkish musician
 Haluk Pekşen (1961–2022), Turkish lawyer, businessman and politician
 Haluk Piyes (born 1975), Turkish-German actor
 Haluk Yıldırım (born 1972), Turkish basketball player

Middle name
Halit Haluk Babacan (born 1966), Turkish sailor 
Şükrü Halûk Akalın (born 1956), Turkish academic
Ümit Haluk Bayülken (1921–2007), Turkish diplomat and politician

Turkish masculine given names